Aruzhan Abdrazak (born 3 September 1997) is a Kazakhstani recurve archer. 

She competed in the individual recurve event and the team recurve event at the 2015 World Archery Championships in Copenhagen, Denmark.

References

External links
World Archery
World Archery competitor list

Kazakhstani female archers
Living people
Place of birth missing (living people)
1997 births
Archers at the 2014 Asian Games
Archers at the 2014 Summer Youth Olympics
Asian Games competitors for Kazakhstan
21st-century Kazakhstani women